P. compacta  may refer to:

 Paracercomonas compacta, a rhizaria species
 Partula compacta, an extinct gastropod species endemic to French Polynesia
 Protea compacta, a plant species
 Pusionella compacta, a sea snail species
 Puya compacta, a plant species endemic to Ecuador

See also
 Compacta (disambiguation)